Calistrat Ilie Cuțov (born 10 October 1948) is a retired Romanian boxer. He won the European lightweight title in 1969 and an Olympic bronze medal in 1968. He also competed in the light-welterweight division at the 1972 and 1976 Olympics, but was eliminated before reaching semifinals. He retired after winning a bronze medal at the 1977 European Championships, with a record of 11 losses out of 398 bouts. Since 1981 he has worked as a boxing coach. His trainees include Daniel Dumitrescu. His brother Simion was also an Olympic medalist in boxing.

Awards 
Honored Sports Trainer ("Antrenor emerit al sportului").
Sports Merit Order, Third Class (1968 and 2004)

1972 Olympic results
Below are the results of Cailstrat Cutov, a Romanian light welterweight boxer who competed at the 1972 Munich Olympics:

 Round of 32: defeated Mohamed Muruli (Uganda) 4-1
 Round of 16: lost to Srisook Buntoe (Thailand) by a third-round TKO

References

External links 

 
 
 

1948 births
Living people
Olympic boxers of Romania
Boxers at the 1968 Summer Olympics
Boxers at the 1972 Summer Olympics
Boxers at the 1976 Summer Olympics
Olympic bronze medalists for Romania
Olympic medalists in boxing
Romanian boxing trainers
People from Brăila County
Romanian male boxers
Medalists at the 1968 Summer Olympics
Lightweight boxers